Nottinghamshire Yeomanry may refer to one of two Yeomanry cavalry regiments of the British Army:

 Nottinghamshire Yeomanry (Sherwood Rangers), one of the five squadrons of the Royal Yeomanry
 Nottinghamshire Yeomanry (South Nottinghamshire Hussars), a unit of the British Army formed as volunteer cavalry